Sintashta is an archaeological site in Chelyabinsk Oblast, Russia. It is the remains of a fortified settlement dating to the Bronze Age, c. 2800–1600 BC, and is the type site of the Sintashta culture. The site has been characterised "fortified metallurgical industrial center".

Sintashta is situated in the steppe just east of the southern Ural Mountains. The site is named for the adjacent Sintashta River, a tributary to the Tobol. The shifting course of the river over time has destroyed half of the site, leaving behind thirty one of the approximately fifty or sixty houses in the settlement.

The settlement consisted of rectangular houses arranged in a circle 140 m in diameter and surrounded by a timber-reinforced earthen wall with gate towers and a deep ditch on its exterior. The fortifications at Sintashta and similar settlements such as Arkaim were of unprecedented scale for the steppe region. There is evidence of copper and bronze metallurgy taking place in every house excavated at Sintashta, again an unprecedented intensity of metallurgical production for the steppe. Early Abashevo culture ceramic styles strongly influenced Sintashta ceramics. Due to the assimilation of tribes in the region of the Urals, such as the Pit-grave, Catacomb, Poltavka, and northern Abashevo into the Novokumak horizon, it would seem inaccurate to provide Sintashta with a purely Aryan attribution. In the origin of Sintashta, the Abashevo culture would play an important role.

Five cemeteries have been found associated with the site, the largest of which (known as Sintashta mogila or SM) consisted of forty graves. Some of these were chariot burials, producing the oldest known chariots in the world. Others included horse sacrifices—up to eight in a single grave—various stone, copper and bronze weapons, and silver and gold ornaments. The SM cemetery is overlain by a very large kurgan of a slightly later date. It has been suggested that the kind of funerary sacrifices evident at Sintashta have strong similarities to funerary rituals described in the Rig Veda, an ancient Indian religious text often associated with the Proto-Indo-Iranians.

Radiocarbon dates from the settlement and cemeteries span over a millennium, suggesting an earlier occupation belonging to the Poltavka culture. The majority of the dates, however, are around 2100–1800 BC, which points at a main period of occupation of the site consistent with other settlements and cemeteries of the Sintashta culture.

Notes

References

External links
Youtube video The Sintashta Culture | Ancient History Documentary (2000 BC) (14.36 minutes)
This video says that
 the Sintashta culture are the  result of an eastwards migration from the Corded Ware culture after 2400 BC, and in the Ural foothills they discovered copper ore. 
Youtube video The Origins of Mounted Warfare | Ancient History Documentary (33.33 minutes)
This video says that
 (starting at time 5.00) after 2200BC the Sintashta culture developed a breed of horses that by 1500BC to 1000BC came to replace all other domesticated horses in the world, and that genetic analysis of those horses' recovered DNA showed that the changes were better temperament and better tolerance to stress and better endurance and better weight-bearing abilities.
 chariots reached China by 1200 BC.
 As the Iron Age came, improvements in horse-riding technology gradually superseded chariots in war and limited them to ceremonial use.
 The usual means of steering the horses was with large round cheekpieces with projections that pressed into the horses' cheeks and forced a fast response to rein pulls that called for a fast turn.
(at time 17.42) In the 17th and 16th centuries BC along the middle Danube, less painful cheekpieces made from lengths of deer antler started to be used, and some say that this shows that by `600BC in eastern Hungary and western Romania there were horse-riding warriors. 
(at time 20/00) Around 1000 BC in the Pontic-Caspian steppe modern-type bridles with bits appear, and their spread coincides with mass abandonment of towns and villages on the steppe.

Bibliography
 

Archaeological sites in Russia
Former populated places in Russia
History of Ural
Andronovo culture
Indo-Iranian archaeological sites
Archaeological type sites
Objects of cultural heritage of Russia of federal significance
Cultural heritage monuments in Chelyabinsk Oblast